The Aleutian Basin is an oceanic basin under the southwestern Bering Sea.  While the northeastern half of the Bering Sea overlies the North American Plate in relatively shallow water, the Aleutian Basin consists of oceanic plate—the remnant of the Kula Plate that was mostly subducted under the North American Plate.

Subduction of the Kula Plate ceased after the creation of the Aleutian Trench to its south.  What remained of the Kula Plate attached to the North American Plate.  This former subduction zone is now the Beringian Margin, which now hosts sixteen submarine canyons, including Zhemchug Canyon, the world's largest.

The deep-water part of the Bering Sea is separated into the Commander Basin and Bowers basins by the submarine Shirshov Ridge  and Bowers Ridge. The Commander Basin occupies the western part of the Bering Sea, with the Shirshov Ridge on its eastern border. The Shirshov Ridge extends 750 km  southward from the Russian Olyutorskii Peninsula to connect with Bowers Ridge. The Bowers Ridge extends in the form of an arc over approximately 900 km from the Aleutian Islands Arc to the northwestern termination, where it meets Shirshov Ridge. This former island arc, Bowers Ridge, is a prominent semi-circular-shaped geological that meets the Aleutian arc and, together with the Aleutians, bounds Bowers Basin.

The northern part of the Shirshov Ridge formed 95 My before the present. The ridge grows younger as it goes south, with the southern part of the Shirshov Ridge formed 33 My ago (Early Oligocene). Bowers Ridge was formed 30 My before the present (Late Oligocene).

References 

Oceanic basins of the Pacific Ocean
Landforms of the Bering Sea